Dardo Manuel Cabo (January 1, 1941 - c. January 6, 1977) was an Argentine journalist, activist and militant. Born in the city of Tres Arroyos, he was the son of a notable metalworkers' union leader, Armando Cabo. Dardo Cabo started political activism in the Movimiento Nacionalista Tacuara (MNT), a far-right youth group of the 1960s. Just like several other members of the MNT, he progressively embraced Peronism, and created in 1961 the Movimiento Nueva Argentina, a Peronist right-wing organization.

Dardo Cabo came to be famous when he hijacked, together with other militants, an Aerolíneas Argentinas' plane on September 28, 1966, and diverted it towards the Malvina Islands [Falkland Islands], where he planted the Argentinian flag, during the so-called 1966 Aerolineas Argentinas DC-4 hijacking Operation Condor. He was then sentenced to three years in prison for this feat, and married there.

Once freed, Dardo Cabo became the leader of the organization Descamisados, which later merged with Montoneros, a left-wing Peronist organization group,which become allied with the Fuerzas Armadas Revolucionarias (Revolutionary Armed Forces), a "guevarista" (Che Guevara) organization (FAR-Montoneros).

He was then arrested during the brutal of the military junta commanded by dictator Jorge Rafael Videla's [National Reorganization Processjunta], because of his political activities, and finally executed in 1977 alongside Roberto Rufino Pirles and other five prisoners.

See also 
Dirty War
Peronism
Movimiento Nacionalista Tacuara

References

1941 births
1977 deaths
Argentine journalists
Male journalists
Deaths by firearm in Argentina
Hijackers
People killed in the Dirty War
People murdered in Argentina
Place of birth missing
People from Buenos Aires Province
20th-century journalists